John McKenzie (11 October 1862 – 3 June 1944) was an Australian cricketer. He played in twenty-two first-class matches for South Australia between 1884 and 1902.

See also
 List of South Australian representative cricketers

References

External links
 

1862 births
1944 deaths
Australian cricketers
South Australia cricketers
Cricketers from Adelaide